Lo Gaduud is a town in the southern Bay region of Somalia.

References
Lo Gaduud

Populated places in Bay, Somalia